Vernon "Little Hack" Cunningham, also listed as L. Cunningham, was an American baseball centerfielder in the Negro leagues. He played with Pollock's Cuban Stars in 1933 and the Baltimore Black Sox in 1934.

References

External links
 and Seamheads

Baltimore Black Sox players
Pollock's Cuban Stars players
Year of birth missing
Year of death missing
Baseball outfielders